First contact may refer to:
First contact (astronomy), the moment in astronomical transit when the apparent positions of the two bodies first touch
First contact (anthropology), the first meeting of two cultures previously unaware of one another
First contact (science fiction), a common science fiction theme about the first meeting between humans and extraterrestrial life

Media

Film
Star Trek: First Contact, a 1996 film in the Star Trek science fiction franchise
First Contact (1983 film), a 1983 documentary by Bob Connolly and Robin Anderson
Ultraman Cosmos: The First Contact, a 2001 theatrical film adaptation of the Ultraman Cosmos TV series

Television
First Contact (Australian TV series), a 2014 Australian television documentary
First Contact (Canadian TV series), a 2018 Canadian documentary television series

TV episodes
"First Contact" (Star Trek: The Next Generation), a 1991 episode of the science fiction television series Star Trek: The Next Generation
"First Contact", the 1994 pilot episode of Earth 2 TV series
"First Contact" (Stargate Atlantis), a 2008 episode of Stargate Atlantis
"First Con-tact" (Star Trek: Prodigy), a 2022 episode of Star Trek: Prodigy
"Episode 0: First Contact", one of the television specials in the Lupin III Japanese media franchise

Literature
First Contact (novelette), a 1945 science fiction novelette by Murray Leinster
First Contact?, a 1971 science fiction novel by Hugh Walters
First Contact, a 2004 book by Mark Anstice

Music
 First Contact (Roger Sanchez album), 2001
 First Contact (Lastlings album), 2020

See also
Potential cultural impact of extraterrestrial contact
The Next Master, according to the Aetherius Society, the coming to Earth of a 'Great Cosmic Being' from another planet